The Texas Real Estate Commission (TREC) is the state agency that governs real estate practices in the state of Texas. The agency is headquartered at 1700 North Congress in Austin.

TREC is composed of nine members appointed by the Governor with the concurrence of the Texas Senate.  The members are appointed for six-year terms, with the terms of three members expiring every two years. Six members must be licensed real estate brokers who have been engaged in the real estate brokerage business as their major occupations for at least five years preceding their appointments.  Three members must be members of the general public who are not regulated by the Commission or employed by organizations regulated by or receiving funds from the Commission.

What Does The Texas Real Estate Commission Do?

 Issue Real Estate Licenses
 Renews Licenses
 Enforces Real Estate Laws & Regulations

Scope
TREC is the state's regulatory agency for the following:

 Real Estate Brokers and Salespersons
 Real Estate Inspectors
 Real Estate Appraisers
 Education Providers for Real Estate and Inspection Courses
 Residential Service Companies
 Timeshare Developers
 Easement Or Right-of-Way (ERW) agents

See also

 The Appraisal Foundation

References

External links
 Texas Real Estate Commission

Real Estate Commission, Texas
Real estate in the United States